Sleeth is a surname. Notable people with the surname include:

Billy Sleeth, American soccer player
Kyle Sleeth, American baseball player
Lou Sleeth, Australian rules footballer
Matthew Sleeth, one of multiple people with the same name
Nancy Sleeth, American environmentalist
Natalie Sleeth, American composer

See also
Sleeth (disambiguation)